Kendyl Stewart (born August 17, 1994) is an American competitive swimmer who specializes in backstroke and butterfly events.

Career
Stewart attends the University of Southern California, where she is a member of the USC Trojans swimming and diving team. At the NCAA Championships, she placed third in the 100 yard butterfly in 2015 and 4th in the 200 yard backstroke in 2013. She won a bronze medal for her prelims swim in the 4 × 100 m medley relay at the 2013 Summer Universiade (World University Games).

At the 2014 Pan Pacific Swimming Championships, Stewart won a silver medal in the 4 × 100 m medley relay and a bronze medal in the 100 m butterfly.

Stewart represented the United States at the 2015 World Aquatics Championships where she won a silver medal for her prelim swim in the 4 × 100 m mixed medley relay. That prelims swim also set a World Record. She placed 4th in the 4 × 100 m medley relay, 9th in the 50 m butterfly, and 10th in the 100 m butterfly.

Coaching career
Stewart currently coaches in the Carlsbad, California, area with the private coaching service CoachUp.

References

External links

 
 

1995 births
Living people
American female backstroke swimmers
American female butterfly swimmers
USC Trojans women's swimmers
World Aquatics Championships medalists in swimming
Universiade medalists in swimming
Universiade bronze medalists for the United States
Swimmers at the 2019 Pan American Games
Pan American Games medalists in swimming
Pan American Games gold medalists for the United States
Medalists at the 2019 Pan American Games
Sportspeople from Newton, Massachusetts